Cotztetlana is a genus of Mexican tarantulas that was first described by J. I. Mendoza M. in 2012.  it contains two species, found in Mexico: C. omiltemi and C. villadai.

See also
 List of Theraphosidae species

References

Theraphosidae genera
Spiders of Mexico
Theraphosidae